According to The World Factbook, the main natural phenomena posing a threat in Italy at a regional level are landslides, mudflows, avalanches, earthquakes, volcanic eruptions, floods and, in Venice, subsidence.

Landslides and mudflows 
As released by the Italian Institute for Environmental Protection and Research (ISPRA), 2.2% of Italian population lives in areas at high or very high risk from landslides, and 3.8% of buildings and 5.8% of cultural heritage sites are located in those places. In the period between 1970 and 2019, landslides caused 1085 deaths, 10 missing people, and 1454 non-fatal injuries. The regions with the highest mortality rate in that period were Aosta Valley and Trentino-Alto Adige/Südtirol.

Earthquakes 

Being placed in the convergence between the Eurasian Plate and the African Plate, Italy (with the relative exception of Sardinia) suffers from seismicity, which is particularly high along the Apennine range, in Calabria, in Sicily and in some places of Northern Italy, such as Friuli, part of Veneto, and western Liguria. According to the Italian Civil Protection, the Italian seismic hazard is medium-high, while the vulnerability is very high also due to the fragility of the Italian building stock and the exposition is extremely high, as a consequence of the population density and the cultural heritage.

Flooding 
As released by the Italian Institute of Environmental Protection and Research (IIEPR), 10.4% of Italian population lives in areas at high or very high risk from floods, and 9.3% of buildings and 15.3% of cultural heritage sites are located in those places. In the period between 1970 and 2019, floods caused 585 deaths, 50 missing people, and 481 non-fatal injuries. The regions with the highest mortality rate in that period were Aosta Valley and Liguria.

Volcanoes 
The Italian authorities have classified the Italian volcanoes on the basis of the time of the last eruption; besides submarine volcanoes and those considered extinct, in Italy there are dormant (Alban Hills, Phlegraean Fields, Ischia, Vesuvius, Lipari, Vulcano, Panarea, Pantelleria) and active volcanoes (Mount Etna and Stromboli)

See also 
 Geography of Italy
 List of earthquakes in Italy

Sources 

Natural disasters in Italy
Italy